Oreobates pereger, also known as the Ayacucho Andes frog, is a species of frog in the family Strabomantidae. It is endemic to Peru where it is known from the eastern slopes of the Cordillera Oriental and Cordillera Vilcabamba mountain ranges.

Description
The skin of dorsum and venter is smooth and with dark gray, reddish-brown, or dark gray-brown ground colour. The flanks are yellowish brown to dull yellow with an orange suffusion ventrally.

Fecundity is about 18–20.

Habitat and conservation
It is threatened by habitat loss caused by agricultural expansion, wood collecting, and human settlement.

References

pereger
Amphibians of the Andes
Amphibians of Peru
Endemic fauna of Peru
Taxa named by John Douglas Lynch
Amphibians described in 1975
Taxonomy articles created by Polbot